Sabina Sharipova was the defending champion, but lost in the first round to Jana Čepelová.

Vitalia Diatchenko won the title, defeating Ankita Raina in the final, 6–4, 6–0.

Seeds

Draw

Finals

Top half

Bottom half

References

Main Draw

Lale Cup - Singles